Trusty Mountain is a summit located in Central New York Region of New York located in the Town of Webb in Herkimer County, east-southeast of Minnehaha.

References

Mountains of Herkimer County, New York
Mountains of New York (state)